Springdale is a rural community in the Matamata-Piako District and Waikato region of New Zealand's North Island.

It is located north-west of Tatuanui, north of Morrinsville and east of Tahuna near State Highway 27.

The area was very swampy in the early 20th century, but has been gradually been developed into productive farmland.

Springdale Hall is used for local events and can accommodate up to 300 people.

Demographics
The SA1 area is part of the larger Mangaiti statistical area.

The SA1 area had a population of 237 at the 2018 New Zealand census, an increase of 42 people (21.5%) since the 2013 census, and an increase of 18 people (8.2%) since the 2006 census. There were 84 households, comprising 111 males and 123 females, giving a sex ratio of 0.9 males per female. The median age was 31.1 years (compared with 37.4 years nationally), with 57 people (24.1%) aged under 15 years, 57 (24.1%) aged 15 to 29, 99 (41.8%) aged 30 to 64, and 24 (10.1%) aged 65 or older.

Ethnicities were 91.1% European/Pākehā, 12.7% Māori, 1.3% Pacific peoples, 1.3% Asian, and 3.8% other ethnicities. People may identify with more than one ethnicity.

Although some people chose not to answer the census's question about religious affiliation, 58.2% had no religion, 24.1% were Christian, 1.3% were Muslim and 1.3% had other religions.

Of those at least 15 years old, 15 (8.3%) people had a bachelor's or higher degree, and 48 (26.7%) people had no formal qualifications. The median income was $36,300, compared with $31,800 nationally. 21 people (11.7%) earned over $70,000 compared to 17.2% nationally. The employment status of those at least 15 was that 93 (51.7%) people were employed full-time, 36 (20.0%) were part-time, and 6 (3.3%) were unemployed.

Mangaiti statistical area
Mangaiti statistical area covers a rural area north and west of Te Aroha.

Mangaiti had a population of 1,338 at the 2018 New Zealand census, an increase of 54 people (4.2%) since the 2013 census, and a decrease of 42 people (−3.0%) since the 2006 census. There were 486 households, comprising 678 males and 660 females, giving a sex ratio of 1.03 males per female. The median age was 36.1 years (compared with 37.4 years nationally), with 297 people (22.2%) aged under 15 years, 267 (20.0%) aged 15 to 29, 597 (44.6%) aged 30 to 64, and 174 (13.0%) aged 65 or older.

Ethnicities were 89.0% European/Pākehā, 14.6% Māori, 1.1% Pacific peoples, 3.1% Asian, and 2.2% other ethnicities. People may identify with more than one ethnicity.

The percentage of people born overseas was 12.6, compared with 27.1% nationally.

Although some people chose not to answer the census's question about religious affiliation, 56.5% had no religion, 31.6% were Christian, 0.9% had Māori religious beliefs, 0.9% were Hindu, 0.2% were Muslim, 0.2% were Buddhist and 0.9% had other religions.

Of those at least 15 years old, 102 (9.8%) people had a bachelor's or higher degree, and 231 (22.2%) people had no formal qualifications. The median income was $37,900, compared with $31,800 nationally. 165 people (15.9%) earned over $70,000 compared to 17.2% nationally. The employment status of those at least 15 was that 585 (56.2%) people were employed full-time, 186 (17.9%) were part-time, and 36 (3.5%) were unemployed.

Education

The school was established in 1915 and celebrated its centenary in 2015. Del Parton, who attended the school from 1927 to 1934, was the oldest living pupil at the event.

The school has received funding from gaming machine charities.

Despite its rural location, students had access to Ultra-Fast Broadband and tablet computers before many other schools.

Teachers at the school have gone on to become long-time principals and senior teachers in other parts of the country.

The school has regular dress-up days.

References

Matamata-Piako District
Populated places in Waikato